The 2018 Spanish motorcycle Grand Prix was the fourth round of the 2018 MotoGP season. It was held at the Circuito de Jerez-Ángel Nieto in Jerez de la Frontera on 6 May 2018.

Classification

MotoGP

Moto2

Moto3

 Darryn Binder suffered a dislocated shoulder in a crash during qualifying and was declared unfit to start the race.

Championship standings after the race

MotoGP

Moto2

Moto3

Notes

References

Spain
Motorcycle Grand Prix
Spanish motorcycle Grand Prix
Spanish motorcycle Grand Prix